The 5th Air Command (Serbo-Croatian: 5. vazduhoplovna komanda/ 5.  ваздухопловна команда) was a joint unit of Yugoslav Air Force.

History
It was established by the order from June 27, 1959, year due to the "Drvar" reorganization plan of Yugoslav Air Force from the 37th Aviation Division with command at Pleso. In 1961 it suffered a change in the organization.

By the new "Drvar 2" reorganization plan of Yugoslav Air Force, on May 2, 1964 5th Air Command was transformed into 5th Aviation Corps.

The commanders of Air command was Radoslav Jović.

Organization

1959-1961
5th Air Command
289th Signal Battalion
379th Engineering Battalion
Liaison Squadron of 5th Air Command
Light Combat Aviation Squadron of 5th Air Command
5th Air Reconnaissance Regiment
117th Fighter Aviation Regiment
109th Fighter-Bomber Aviation Regiment
111th Fighter-Bomber Aviation Regiment
184th Reconnaissance Aviation Regiment
151st Air Base
258th Air Base
474th Air Base

1961-1964
5th Air Command
289th Signal Battalion
379th Engineering Battalion
5th Air Reconnaissance Regiment
117th Fighter Aviation Regiment
109th Fighter-Bomber Aviation Regiment
111th Support Aviation Regiment
184th Reconnaissance Aviation Regiment
151st Air Base
258th Air Base
474th Air Base

Headquarters
Pleso

Commanding officers 
Colonel Radoslav Jović

References 
Notes and citations

Bibliography
 

Air Commands of Yugoslav Air Force
Military units and formations established in 1959